Pine Grove, Wisconsin may refer to multiple places:
Pine Grove, Brown County, Wisconsin, unincorporated community
Pine Grove, Chippewa County, Wisconsin, unincorporated community
Pine Grove, Portage County, Wisconsin, town